Orthopyroxenite is an ultramafic and ultrabasic rock that is almost exclusively made from the mineral orthopyroxene, the orthorhombic version of pyroxene and a type of pyroxenite. It can have up to a few percent of olivine and clinopyroxene.

Orthopyroxenites can also occur on other planets. ALH 84001 is a Martian meteorite that can be classified as an orthopyroxenite. It is the only meteorite found with that composition and the only member of the Martian orthopyroxenite group of meteorites.

References

Ultramafic rocks
Meteorites